is an arcade game developed by Falcon, released in 1981 and similar to Nintendo's Donkey Kong. Although commonly believed to be a bootleg version, it was officially licensed for operation only in Japan when Nintendo couldn't keep up with domestic demand (even though Donkey Kong was still released there), and is based on different hardware. It retains all the gameplay elements of Donkey Kong, but its graphics were redrawn and re-colorized. Falcon breached their contract by exporting the cabinets overseas, leading Nintendo to revoke the license in January 1982. Like the original game, Crazy Kong had bootleg versions under such titles as Congorilla, Big Kong, Donkey King and Monkey Donkey.

There are two versions of the original: Crazy Kong and Crazy Kong Part II. The differences between them are in minor cinematic artifacts and bugs, color palette choices and minor gameplay differences; the first part then shows no copyright or company name on the title screen. Both run on modified Crazy Climber hardware; there are other versions that run on Scramble, Jeutel, Orca, and Alca hardware. The official Crazy Kong came in two stand-up cabinets featuring a large and angry (rather than comic) ape; they were manufactured by Zaccaria (also Italian distributor of the game).

Differences from Donkey Kong
 The game's title screen shows the text "Crazy Kong", written in girders, dependent upon which version is running. There is no copyright or graphic of Kong on the main screen, just the year '1981'. The girder text does not flash different colours for a few seconds before stopping, as in Donkey Kong.
 The color palette is almost completely different. Most of the girders have been switched from magenta/purple to neon green, including those on the title screen.
 Some graphics were redrawn. While the Donkey Kong character looks almost the same from side view, his frontal appearance is noticeably different when he opens his mouth; he is taller and fiercer-looking.
 Many animations are removed. For example, in the classic first level, barrels appear from Crazy Kong, as opposed to showing the rolling animations. Kong is locked in the horizontal roll animation, but does not reach for the other barrels or move when rolling barrels vertically. Frames of animation are also removed at the beginning and ending of each level.
 The sound effects are altered and generally cruder. The background humming music is removed (sans the Scramble hardware release) and Mario makes a digital sample "hi-yah" sound when jumping. A lot of the in-game sounds, such as Kong's chest-beating, can also be found in the game Crazy Climber on those versions that run on its proprietary hardware.
 Some aspects of the game are considered more difficult than Donkey Kong, as the collision detection is less forgiving and certain elements of the game move faster.
 The first level can be completed with the following cheat: Climb up the ladder at the far right of the bottom platform. Make sure Mario's back is facing you while tapping the joystick until his right foot is hanging over the ledge. Jump off the platform. If done correctly, he drops through the floor below and the level is completed.
 The ghost-like flames at the 100m mark (the rivet level) are replaced with the oil-fire enemies that inhabit the other levels.
 After completing the 100m mark, the heart that normally exists between Mario and Pauline is positioned near the round indicator.
 When entering a high score, any of the 12 available characters that is not used is replaced with a dash (-).
 Mario wears the brown and muddy-red colors similar to those in the original Super Mario Bros., except in the 100m level, where he appears in a corrupted orange-and-green palette.
 All of the game's sounds are taken from Crazy Climber.
 On the 100m level, it is possible to touch and walk past Crazy Kong without losing a life.

Differences in Crazy Kong Part II
 During attract mode, a scene is shown where Crazy Kong is breaking out of a cage along with a rudimentary one channel audio tune.
 Most of the steel girders have been switched from a magenta/purple color to an orange/red color, including the title screen.
 After completing the 100m mark, the text "GIVE UP!!" appears.
 During round 2 and on (when L=02), gaps appear in the girders of the 25m mark (the sloped level).
 In the 25m level, some slopes are cut off so that they no longer go downward past the ladder.
 Unlike Crazy Kong, Mario has accurate/traditional colors.

Legacy
As Nintendo released Donkey Kong Jr. (a Donkey Kong sequel), Falcon developed and published a cloned-sequel as well entitled Crazy Kong Jr, also known as Crazy Junior, but unlike the previous one, it was unlicensed by both Nintendo and Nintendo of America.

References

External links

1981 video games
Arcade video games
Arcade-only video games
Donkey Kong
Platform games
Video game clones
Video games about primates
Video games developed in Japan